Virginia railway station is located on the North Coast line in Queensland, Australia. It serves the Brisbane suburb of Virginia. On 28 August 2000, a third platform opened as part of the addition of a third track from Northgate to Bald Hills.

Services
Virginia is served by all City network services from Kippa-Ring to Central, many continuing to Springfield Central

Services by platform

References

External links

Virginia station Queensland Rail
Virginia station Queensland's Railways on the Internet

Railway stations in Brisbane
Virginia, Queensland
North Coast railway line, Queensland